Jessie Little Doe Baird (also Jessie Little Doe Fermino, born 18 November 1963) is a linguist known for her efforts to revive the Wampanoag (Wôpanâak) language. She received a MacArthur Fellowship in 2010.

She lives in Mashpee, Massachusetts.

Life
In 1992 or 1993, Baird experienced many dreams that she believed to be visions of her ancestors meeting her and speaking in their language, which she did not understand at first. According to a prophecy of her Wampanoag community, a woman of their kind would leave her home to bring back their language and "the children of those who had had a hand in breaking the language cycle would help heal it." In around the same year, Baird began teaching the Wôpanâak language at tribal sites in Mashpee and Aquinnah.

Baird studied for a master's degree from the Massachusetts Institute of Technology three years later, where she studied with linguist Dr. Kenneth L. Hale; together they collaborated to create a language database based on official written records, government correspondences and religious texts, especially a 1663 Bible printed by Puritan minister John Eliot kept in the archives of MIT. This led to the first +10,000-word dictionary of Wôpanâak language, complied by Baird and Hale in 1996.

Baird and her work on Wôpanâak language reconstruction and revival are the subject of a PBS documentary, We Still Live Here – Âs Nutayuneân, directed by Anne Makepeace.

Baird also serves as the vice-chairwoman of the Mashpee Wampanoag Indian Tribal Council.

In 2017, Jessie Little Doe Baird received an honorary Doctorate in Social Sciences from Yale University.

References

External links 
  11 min.
   Additional footage from the "We Still Live Here – Âs Nutayuneân" documentary (2011).
 Wôpanâak Language Reclamation Project.  Retrieved 14 November 2022.

1963 births
Living people
MacArthur Fellows
Native American linguists
Native American language revitalization
MIT School of Humanities, Arts, and Social Sciences alumni
Place of birth missing (living people)
Linguists of Algic languages
Mashpee Wampanoag people
Native American people from Massachusetts
20th-century linguists
21st-century linguists
20th-century Native Americans
21st-century Native Americans
Linguists from the United States
21st-century Native American women
Women linguists